Abdul Majid Mallick is a Bangladesh Nationalist Party politician and a Member of Parliament from Barguna-3.

Career
Mallick was elected to parliament from Barguna-3 as an Bangladesh Nationalist Party candidate in February 1996.

References

Bangladesh Nationalist Party politicians
Date of birth missing (living people)
6th Jatiya Sangsad members